This is a list of magazines published in India, sorted on basis of language.

Assamese 

 Prantik - Fortnightly magazine
 Gariyoshi (গৰীয়সী) - Monthly magazine
 Roopkar - Monthly magazine
 Bismoi - Monthly magazine

Bengali 

 Anandalok (আনন্দলোক) - Biweekly magazine
 Anandamela (আনন্দমেলা) - Fortnightly magazine (5th & 20th of every month)
 Desh magazine (দেশ) - Fortnightly magazine (2nd & 17th of every month)
 Grihshobha (গৃহশোভা) – Biweekly women's magazine
 Sananda (সানন্দা) – Women's magazine
 Unish-Kuri  (উনিশ কুড়ি) - Fortnightly magazine focused on young adults 
 Saptahik Bartaman (সাপ্তাহিক বর্তমান) - Weekly magazine

Dogri 

 Shiraza Dogri – bimonthly literary magazine

English 

 Better Interiors - interior design
 The Luxury Collection Magazine - Luxury lifestyle magazine
 Better Photography
 Business India – bimonthly
 Business Today – fortnightly
 Businessworld - fortnightly 
 The Caravan – journal of politics and culture, published by Delhi Press
 Champak – children's magazine
 CTO Forum – monthly
 CFO India – monthly

 Dataquest – fortnightly information technology
 Digit – IT gadgets and mobile phones
 Down to Earth - fortnightly politics of environment and development magazine
 Electronics For You – technology monthly
 Express Computer – monthly information technology
 Femina India – women's magazine
 Filmfare – Bollywood magazine
 Forbes India – business magazine
 Frontline – current affairs magazine
 Gobar Times - monthly environmental education magazine for young adults
 GQ – Indian edition
 Himal Southasian
 India Today
 FHM India – monthly
 Industry 2.0 – manufacturing technology updates and news monthly
 Intelligent Computing CHIP magazine
 New Woman
 Organiser – weekly current affairs magazine
 OPEN – current affairs and features magazine
 Open Source For You – monthly
 Outlook
 Overdrive
 ParentCircle - Parenting magazine
 PCQuest – technology publication
 Psychologs – Monthly Mental Health Magazine
 Reader's Digest – monthly general interest family magazine
 Rock Street Journal – covering the Indian independent music scene
 Sanctuary Asia
 Society – monthly celebrity/lifestyle magazine
 Sportstar
 Swarajya
 Tinkle – children's magazine
 Today's Traveller
 Tehelka – news weekly
 Time Magazine Asia – weekly
 Tinpahar – bimonthly, bilingual
 Top Gear
 Vedanta Kesari - monthly cultural/spiritual, inspired by Vivekananda and Ramakrishna
 Verve
 Vogue – monthly fashion and lifestyle magazine
 The Week
 Woman's Era - food fashion and lifestyle magazine

Gujarati 

 Buddhiprakash
 Champak – children's magazine
 Chetana
 Chitralekha – weekly
 Dalitchetna
 Dhabak
 Doot
 Gazalvishwa
 Gujarati
 Grihshobha – biweekly women's magazine
 Kavilok
 Kumar
 Parivesh
 Ruchi
 Safari – monthly science magazine
 Shabdasrishti

Hindi 

 Akhand Jyoti
 Champak
 Grihshobha – biweekly women's magazine
 Femina India – women's magazine
 Kadambini
 Madhu Muskan
 Meri Saheli
 Overdrive
 Panchjanya
 Parag
 Pratiyogita Darpan
 Saras Salil
 Sarita
 Vanita
 Yog Sandesh

Kannada 

 Balamangala – children's magazine
 Champaka – children's magazine
 Chutuka – children's magazine
 Grihshobha – biweekly women's magazine
 Karmaveera – weekly
 Kasthuri
 Mangala
 Mayura
 O Manase, fortnightly
 Roopatara
 Sakhi
 Slum Jagathu
 Sudha – weekly
 Taranga – weekly
 Tunturu – children's magazine
 Tushara

Konkani 

 Dor Mhoineachi Rotti – monthly
 Raknno – weekly

Malayalam 

 Balabhumi
 Balamangalam
 Balarama
 Bhashaposhini
 Bobanum Moliyum
 Champak – children's magazine
 Chandrika – weekly
 Chithrabhumi  Cinema Mangalam Desabhimani – weekly
 Grihshobha – biweekly women's magazine
 Kalakaumudi Kanyaka Kerala Kaumudi – weekly 
 Eureka Labour India Madhyamam Weekly'
 Mangalam Weekly
 Manorama Weekly
 Mathrubhumi – illustrated weekly
 Poompatta
 Prabodhanam
 Samakalika Malayalam
 Vanitha
 Vellinakshatram
 Dhanam

Marathi 

 Champak – children's magazine
 Chitralekha – weekly
 Grihshobha – biweekly women's magazine

Odia 

 Kadambini – monthly
 Saptahik Samaya – weekly
 Sahitya Charcha – Monthly

Tamil 

 Puthiya Thalaimurai
 Cinema Express
 Champak – children's magazine
 Grihshobha – biweekly women's magazine
 Kalki
 Femina India – women's magazine
 Kumudam
 Kungumam
 Ananda Vikatan
 Sigappunada
 Thuglak
 Vikatan

Telugu 

 Andhra Bhoomi - Deccan Chronicle Holdings limited
 Andhra Prabha-Andhra Prabha Publications ltd.
 Annadata - Agricultural magazine
 Swathi (- weekly )Swathi publications
 Champak – (children's magazine) Delhi press
 Chandamama - (monthly children's magazine ) Geodesic ltd.
 Eenadu – (Weekly magazine)Eenadu publications
 Grihshobha – biweekly women's magazine
 Rythubandhu - (agricultural ) Narla Media Network Pvt.LTD.
 Sapthagiri - (monthly devotional magazine) Tirumala Tirupathi Devasthanam

Urdu 

Biswin Sadi
Din Dunia
Shabkhoon
Shair
Shama

See also 
 Media of India

Lists
 List of Indian comics
 List of newspapers in India
 List of radio stations in India
 List of Indian TV channels
 List of Indian films

References 

India